Arvid Mauritz Posse (5 January 1792 – 22 July 1850) was a Swedish politician, count and Marshal of the Realm, who served as Prime Minister for Justice in 1840 and between 1846–1848.

Biography
Posse was born into a noble family, as the son of Count and Lord of the Realm Arvid Erik Posse and his wife, the baroness Catharina Charlotta von Otter. The family was of Jutlandic origin and belonged to the high nobility, having been raised to countship in 1706. Posse received his education at Lund University. He went on to work at Göta Court of Appeal and later became an assessor at the Svea Court of Appeal in 1816. Prior to his appointment as Prime Minister for Justice, Posse had served as governor of Skaraborg County as well as  director-general of the Swedish Customs Service.

By 1840, Posse became known for his liberal positions in matters concerning free trade in the Riksdag of the Estates and following the government resignation in 1840, the king had him appointed Prime Minister for Justice. This was done in order to ease the pressure from the liberal opposition. However, his term at the office become short and Posse was forced to resign later that same year.
During the Riksdag of 1845, Posse was appointed Marshal of the Realm. This eventually lead to him being appointed for a second time as Prime Minister for Justice in the government of 1846. Following the political turmoil after the March Unrest and due to popular protests against the government, Posse resigned from his office in 1848 along with his most of his cabinet.

In 1849, due to his declining health Posse resigned as Marshal of the Realm and died the following year in Gothenburg.

He was the uncle of Prime Minister Arvid Posse.

References

External links

|-

1792 births
1850 deaths
Swedish Ministers for Justice
Swedish nobility
Swedish counts
Marshals of the Realm
Commanders of the Order of the Polar Star
19th-century Swedish politicians
Members of the Riksdag of the Estates